Tenya railway station is a railway station on the Howrah–Azimganj line of Howrah railway division of Eastern Railway zone in India. It is situated at Tenya in Murshidabad district in the state of West Bengal.

History
In 1913, the Hooghly–Katwa Railway constructed a  broad gauge line from Bandel to Katwa, and the Barharwa–Azimganj–Katwa Railway constructed the 5ft 6in broad gauge Barharwa–Azimganj–Katwa loop. With the construction of the Farakka Barrage and opening of the railway bridge in 1971, the railway communication picture of this line were completely changed.

26 trains including a few passenger trains and EMU stop at Tenya.

References

Railway stations in Murshidabad district
Howrah railway division